Ingalls is an unincorporated community in Avery County, North Carolina, United States. The community is located at the intersection of US 19-E and NC 194.  The Avery County Airport (Morrison Field) is located two miles south from Ingalls, towards Spruce Pine.

See also
 North Toe River
 Unaka Range

References

Unincorporated communities in Avery County, North Carolina
Unincorporated communities in North Carolina